The Dancing Water, the Singing Apple, and the Speaking Bird is a Sicilian fairy tale collected by Giuseppe Pitrè, and translated by Thomas Frederick Crane for his Italian Popular Tales. Joseph Jacobs included a reconstruction of the story in his European Folk and Fairy Tales. The original title is "", for which Crane gives a literal translation of "The Herb-gatherer's Daughters."

The story is the prototypical example of Aarne–Thompson–Uther tale-type 707, to which it gives its name.

According to folklorist Stith Thompson, the tale is "one of the eight or ten best known plots in the world".

Synopsis
The following is a summary of the tale as it was collected by Giuseppe Pitrè and translated by Thomas Frederick Crane.

A king walking the streets heard three poor sisters talk. The oldest said that if she married the royal butler, she would give the entire court a drink out of one glass, with water left over. The second said that if she married the keeper of the royal wardrobe, she would dress the entire court in one piece of cloth, and have some left over. The youngest said that if she married the king, she would bear two sons with apples in their hands, and a daughter with a star on her forehead.

The next morning, the king ordered the older two sisters to do as they said, and then married them to the butler and the keeper of the royal wardrobe, and the youngest to himself. The queen became pregnant, and the king had to go to war, leaving behind news that he was to hear of the birth of his children. The queen gave birth to the children she had promised, but her sisters, jealous, put three puppies in their place, sent word to the king, and handed over the children to be abandoned. The king ordered that his wife be put in a treadwheel crane.

Three fairies saw the abandoned children and gave them a deer to nurse them, a purse full of money, and a ring that changed color when misfortune befell one of them. When they were grown, they left for the city and took a house.

Their aunts saw them and were terror-struck. They sent their nurse to visit the daughter and tell her that the house needed the Dancing Water to be perfect and her brothers should get it for her. The oldest son left and found three hermits in turn. The first two could not help him, but the third told him how to retrieve the Dancing Water, and he brought it back to the house. On seeing it, the aunts sent their nurse to tell the girl that the house needed the Singing Apple as well, but the brother got it, as he had the Dancing Water. The third time, they sent him after the Speaking Bird, but as one of the conditions was that he not respond to the bird, and it told him that his aunts were trying to kill him and his mother was in the treadmill, it shocked him into speech, and he was turned to stone. The ring changed colors. His brother came after him, but suffered the same fate. Their sister came after them both, said nothing, and transformed her brother and many other statues back to life.

They returned home, and the king saw them and thought that if he did not know his wife had given birth to three puppies, he would think these his children. They invited him to dinner, and the Speaking Bird told the king all that had happened. The king executed the aunts and their nurse and took his wife and children back to the palace.

Analysis

Tale type
The tale is classified in the international Aarne-Thompson-Uther Index as type ATU 707, "The Three Golden Children". 

According to Folklore scholar Christine Goldberg, the form the tale type appears "throughout Europe" involves the heroes going on a quest for wondrous items. Richard MacGillivray Dawkins stated that "as a rule there are three quests" and the third item is "almost always ... a magical speaking bird". In other variants, according to scholar Hasan El-Shamy, the quest objects include "the dancing plant, the singing object and the truth-speaking bird".

Variations
Russian folklorist  also noted two different formats to the tale type: the first one, "legs of gold up the knee, arms of silver up to the elbow", and the second one, "the singing tree and the talking bird".

The Brother Quests for a Bride
In some regional variants, the children are sent for some magical objects, like a mirror, and for a woman of renowned beauty and great powers. This character  becomes the male sibling's wife at the end of the story. For instance, in the Typen Turkischer Volksmärchen ("Types of Turkish Foltkales"), by folklorists Wolfram Eberhard and Pertev Naili Boratav. Type 707 is known in Turkey as Die Schöne or Güzel ("The Beautiful"). The title refers to the maiden of supernatural beauty that is sought after by the male sibling.

These stories substitute the quest for the items for the search for a fairy named  ("Beauty of the Land"), a woman of extraordinary beauty and magical powers. One such tale is present in Robert Elsie's collection of Albanian folktales (Albania's Folktales and Legends): The Youth and the Maiden with Stars on their Foreheads and Crescents on their Breasts.

Another version of the story is The Tale of Arab-Zandyq, in which the brother is the hero who gathers the wonderful objects (a magical flower and a mirror) and their owner (Arab-Zandyq), whom he later marries. Arab-Zandyq replaces the bird and, as such, tells the whole truth during her wedding banquet.

In an extended version from a Breton source, called , the youngest triplet, a king's son, listens to the helper (an old woman), who reveals herself to be a princess enchanted by her godmother. In a surprise appearance by said godmother, she prophecises her goddaughter shall marry the hero of the tale (the youngest prince), after a war with another country.

Another motif that appears in these variants (specially in Middle East and Turkey) is suckling an ogress's breastmilk by the hero.

The Sister marries a Prince

In an Icelandic variant collected by Jón Árnason and translated in his book Icelandic Legends (1866), with the name  (The Story of the Farmer's Three Daughters, or its German translation), the quest focus on the search for the bird and omits the other two items. The end is very much the same, with the nameless sister rescuing her brothers Vilhjámr and Sigurdr and a prince from the petrification spell and later marrying him.

Another variant where this happy ending occurs is Princesse Belle-Étoile et Prince Chéri, by Mme. D'Aulnoy, where the heroine rescues her cousin, Prince Chéri, and marries him. Another French variant, collected by Henry Carnoy (or "The tree that sings, the bird that speaks and the water of gold"), has the youngest daughter, the princess, marry an enchanted old man she meets in her journey and who gives her advice on how to obtain the items.

In the Armenian variant Théodore, le Danseur, the brother ventures on a quest for the belongings of the eponymous character and, at the conclusion of the tale, this fabled male dancer marries the sister.

Alternate Source for the Truth to the King (Father)
In the description of the tale type in the international index, the bird the children seek is the one to tell the king the sisters' deceit and to reunite the family. However, in some regional variants, the supernatural maiden whom the brother and the sister seek is responsible for revealing the truth of their birth to the king and to restore the queen to her rightful place.

Very rarely, it is one of the children themselves that reveal the aunts' treachery to their father, as seen in the Armenian variants The Twins and Theodore, le Danseur. In a specific Persian version, from Kamani, the Prince (King's son) investigates the mystery of the twins and questions the midwife who helped in the delivery of his children.

Distribution
Late 19th-century and early 20th-century scholars (Joseph Jacobs, Teófilo Braga, Francis Hindes Groome) had noted that the story was widespread across Europe, the Middle East and India. Portuguese writer Braga noticed its prevalence in Italy, France, Germany, Spain and in Russian and Slavic sources, while Groome listed its incidence in the Caucasus, Egypt, Syria and Brazil.

Russian comparative mythologist Yuri Berezkin (ru) pointed out that the tale type can be found "from Ireland and Maghreb, to India and Mongolia", in Africa and Siberia.

Europe

Italy

France

Iberian Peninsula

There are also variants in Romance languages: a Spanish version called Los siete infantes, where there are seven children with stars on their foreheads, and a Portuguese one, As cunhadas do rei (The King's sisters-in-law). Both replace the fantastical elements with Christian imagery: the devil and the Virgin Mary.

Portuguese writer, lawyer and teacher  published a versified variant from the Madeira Archipelago with the title Los Encantamentos da Grande Fada Maria. Portuguese folklorist Teófilo Braga cited the Madeiran tale as a variant of the Portuguese tales he collected.

Folklore researcher Elsie Spicer Eells published a variant from Azores with the title The Listening King: a king likes to disguise himself and go through the streets at night to listen to his subjects' talk. He overhears the three sisters' talk, the youngest wanting to marry him. They do and she gives birth to twin boys with a gold star on the forehead. They are cast in the sea in a basket and found by a miller and his wife. Years later, they find a parrot with green and gold feathers in the royal gardens.

Portugal
Brazilian folklorist Luís da Câmara Cascudo suggested that the tale type migrated to Portugal brought by the Arabs.

Portuguese folklorist Teófilo Braga published a Portuguese tale from Airão-Minho with the title As cunhadas do rei ("The King's sisters-in-law"): the king, his cook and his butler walk through the streets in disguise to listen to the thoughts of the people. They pass by a verandah where three sisters are standing. The three women notice the men and the elder recognizes the cook, wanting to marry him to eat the best fricassees; the middle one sees the butler and wants to marry him to get to drink the best liquors; the youngest sister wants to marry the king and bear him three boys with a golden star on the front. The youngest sister marries the king and bears him twin boys with the golden stars, and the next year a little girl with a golden star on the front. They are replaced for animals and cast in the water, but are saved by a miller. Years later, their aunts send them for a parrot from a garden, for the tree that drips blood and the "water of a thousand springs". The Virgin Mary appears to instruct the sister on how to get a branch from tree and a jug of the water, and how to rescue her brothers from petrification.

Spain

United Kingdom and Ireland
According to Daniel J. Crowley, British sources point to 92 variants of the tale type. However, he specified that most variants were found in the Irish Folklore Archives, plus some "scattered Scottish and English references".

Scottish folklorist John Francis Campbell mentioned the existence of "a Gaelic version" of the French tale Princesse Belle-Étoile, itself a literary variant of type ATU 707. He also remarked that "[the] French story agree[d] with Gaelic stories", since they shared common elements: the wonder children, the three treasures, etc.

Ireland
Scholarship points to the existence of many variants in Irish folklore. In fact, the tale type shows "wide distribution" in Ireland. However, according to researcher Maxim Fomin, this diffusion is perhaps attributed to a printed edition of The Arabian Nights.

One version was published in journal Béaloideas with the title An Triúr Páiste Agus A Dtrí Réalta: a king wants to marry a girl who can jump the highest; the youngest of three sisters fulfills the task and becomes queen. When she gives birth to three royal children, their aunts replace them with animals (a young pig, a cat and a crow). The queen is cast into a river, but survives, and the king marries one of her sisters. The children are found and reared by a sow. When the foster mother is threatened to be killed on orders of the second queen, she gives the royal children three stars, a towel that grants unlimited food and a magical book that reveals the truth of their origin.

Another variant has been recorded by Irish folklorist Sean O'Suilleabhain in Folktales of Ireland, under the name The Speckled Bull. In this variant, a prince marries the youngest of two sisters. Her elder sisters replaces the prince's children (two boys), lies that the princess gave birth to animals and casts the boys in a box into the sea, one year after the other. The second child is saved by a fisherman and grows strong. The queen's sister learns of the boy's survival and tries to convince his foster father's wife that the child is a changeling. She kills the boy and buries his body in the garden, from where a tree sprouts. Some time later, the prince's cattle grazed near the tree and a cow eats its fruit. The cow gives birth to a speckled calf that becomes a mighty bull. The queen's sister suspects the bull is the boy and feigns illness to have it killed. The bull escapes by flying to a distant kingdom in the east. The princess of this realm, under a geasa to always wear a veil outdoors lest she marries the first man she sets eyes on, sees the bull and notices it is a king's son. They marry, and the speckled bull, under a geas, chooses to be a bull by day and man by night. The bull regains human form and rescues his mother.

In Types of the Irish Folktale (1963), by the same author, he listed a variant titled Uisce an Óir, Crann an Cheoil agus Éan na Scéalaíochta.

Scotland
As a parallel to the Irish tale An Triúr Páiste Agus A Dtrí Réalta, published in Béaloideas, J. G McKay commented that the motif of the replacement of the newborns for animals occurs "in innumerable Scottish tales.".

Research Sheila Douglas collected from teller John Stewart, from Perthshire, two variants: The Speaking Bird of Paradise and Cats, Dogs, and Blocks. In both of them, a king and a queen have three children (two boys and a girl), in three consecutive pregnancies, who are taken from them by the housekeeper and abandoned in the woods. Years later, a helpful kind woman tells them about their royal heritage, and advises them to seek the Speaking Bird of Paradise, which will help them reveal the truth to their parents.

Wales
In a Welsh-Romani variant, Ī Tārnī Čikalī ("The Little Slut"), the protagonist is a Cinderella-like character who is humiliated by her sisters, but triumphs in the end. However, in the second part of the story, she gives birth to three children (a girl first, and two boys later) "girt with golden belts". They children are replaced for animals and taken to the forest. Their mother is accused of imaginary crimes and sentenced to be killed, but the old woman helper (who gave her the slippers) turns her into a sow, and tells her she may be killed and her liver taken by the hunters, by she will prevail in the end. The sow meets the children in the forest. The sow is killed, but, as the old woman prophecizes, her liver gained magical powers and her children use it to suit their needs. A neighbouring king wants the golden belts, but once they are taken from the boys, they become swans in the river. Their sister goes to the liver and wishes for their return to human form, as well as to get her mother back. The magical powers of the liver grant her wishes.

Mediterranean Area

Greece

Albania

Malta
German linguist Hans Stumme collected a Maltese variant he translated as Sonne und Mond ("Sun and Moon"), in Maltesische Märchen (1904). This tale begins with the ATU 707 (twins born with astronomical motifs/aspects), but the story continues under the ATU 706 tale-type (The Maiden without hands): mother has her hands chopped off and abandoned with her children in the forest.

 published another Maltese tale titled Sonne und Mond, das tanzende Wasser und der singende Vogel ("Sun and Moon, the dancing water and the singing bird"). In this version, the third sister gives birth to a girl named Sun, and a boy named Moon.

Cyprus
At least one variant from Cyprus has been published, from the "Folklore Archive of the Cyprus Research Centre".

Western and Central Europe

In a Lovari Romani variant, the king meets the third sister during a dance at the village, who promised to give birth to a golden boy. They marry. Whenever a child is born to her (two golden boys and a golden girl, in three consecutive births), they are replaced for an animal and cast into the water. The king banishes his wife and orders her to be walled up, her eyes to be put on her forehead and to be spat on by passersby. An elderly fisherman and his wife rescue the children and name them Ējfēlke (Midnight), Hajnalka (Dawn) - for the time of day when the boys were saved - and Julishka for the girl. They discover they are adopted and their foster parents suggest they climb a "cut-glass mountain" for a bird that knows many things, and may reveal the origin of the parentage. At the end of their quest, young Julishka fetches the bird, of a "rusty old" appearance, and brings it home. With the bird's feathers, she and her brothers restore their mother to perfect health and disenchant the bird to human form. Julishka marries the now human bird.

Germany

In a Sorbian/Wendish (Lausitz) variant, Der Sternprinz ("The Star Prince"), three discharged soldier brothers gather at a tavern to talk about their dreams. The first two dreamt of extraordinary objects: a large magical chain and an inexhaustible purse. The third soldier says he dreamt that if he marries the princess, they will have a son with a golden star on the forehead ("słoćanu gwězdu na cole"). The three men go to the king and the third marries the princess, who gives birth to the promised boy. However, the child is replaced by a dog and thrown in the water, but he is saved by a fisherman. Years later, on a hunt, the Star Prince tries to shoot a white hind, but it says it is the enchanted Queen of Rosenthal. She alerts that his father and uncles are in the dungeon and his mother is to marry another person. She also warns that he must promise not reveal her name. He stops the wedding and releases his uncles. They celebrate their family reunion, during which the Star Prince reveals the Queen's name. She departs and he must go on a quest after her (tale type ATU 400, "The Quest for the Lost Wife").

Belgium
Professor Maurits de Meyere listed three variants under the banner "L'oiseau qui parle, l'arbre qui chante et l'eau merveilleuse", attested in Flanders fairy tale collections, in Belgium, all with contamination from other tale types (two with ATU 303, "The Twins or Blood Brothers", and one with tale type ATU 304, "The Dangerous Night-Watch").

A variant titled La fille du marchand was collected by Emile Dantinne from the Huy region ("Vallée du Hoyoux"), in Wallonia.

Switzerland
In a variant from Surselva, Ils treis lufts or Die drei Köhler ("The Three Charcoal-Burners"), three men meet in a pub to talk about their dreams. The first dreamt that he found seven gold coins under his pillow, and it came true. The second, that he found a golden chain, which also came true. The third, that he had a son with a golden star on the forehead. The king learns of their dreams and is gifted the golden chain. He marries his daughter to the third charcoal burner and she gives birth to the boy with a golden star. However, the queen replaces her grandson with a puppy and throws the child in the river.

Hungary

Scandinavia

Iceland

Denmark

Sweden

Finland

Karelia

In a Karelian tale, "Девять золотых сыновей" ("Nine Golden Sons"), the third sister promises to give birth to "three times three" children, their arms of gold up to the elbow, the legs of silver up to the knees, a moon on the temples, a sun on the front and stars in their hair. The king overhears their conversation and takes the woman as his wife. On their way, they meet a woman named Syöjätär, who insists to be the future queen's midwife. She gives birth to triplets in three consecutive pregnancies, but Syöjätär replaces them for rats, crows and puppies. The queen saves one of her children and is cast into a sea in a barrel. The remaining son asks his mother to bake bread with her breastmilk to rescue his brothers.

In a Karelian tale by Karelian teller , titled "Starina Turkin sultanista", the Turkish sultan passes by the house of an old woman and her three daughters, and spies on their conversation, the third sister wants to marry the sultan and give birth to "three golden children". The sultan takes the youngest sister as his wife. When she is ready to give birth to each child (in three consecutive pregnancies), her elder sister comes as her midwife, and replaces the children for animals: the elder, a boy, for a magpie; the second, another boy, for a crow, and the third, a girl, for a chick. Each time, the child is cast in the water in a box, but they are saved by a childless miller and his wife. The sultan orders his wife to be locked inside a stone structure in the churchyard, and to be fed only with water and bread. Years later, after the children grow up, a mysterious old woman comes to the miller's house, compliments the three siblings and bids them seek the bubbling spring, the ringing birch tree and the speaking bird. The elder brothers fail and become marble stones, but the girl, advised by an old man, gets the treasures. The old man reveals they are the sultan's children.

Zaonezh'ya

Veps people

Baltic Region

Latvia
The work of Latvian folklorist Peteris Šmidts, beginning with Latviešu pasakas un teikas ("Latvian folktales and fables") (1925–1937), records 33 variants of the tale type. Its name in Latvian sources is Trīs brīnuma dēli or Brīnuma dēli.

According to the Latvian Folktale Catalogue, tale type 707, "The Three Golden Children", is known in Latvia as Brīnuma bērni ("Wonderful Children"), comprising 4 different redactions. Its second redaction is the one that follows the siblings' quest for the treasures (a tree that plays music, a bird that speaks and the water of life).

Estonia

Lithuania
The tale type is known in Lithuanian compilations as Trys nepaprasti kūdikiai, Nepaprasti vaikai or Trys auksiniai sûnûs.

Lithuanian folklorist Jonas Balys (lt) published in 1936 an analysis of Lithuanian folktales, citing 65 variants available until then. In his tabulation, he noted that the third sister promised children with astronomical birthmarks, and, years later, her children seek a talking bird, a singing tree and the water of life.

According to professor , the tale type is reported to register 244 (two hundred and forty-four) Lithuanian variants, under the banner Three Extraordinary Babies, with and without contamination from other tale types. However, only 34 variants in Lithuania contain the quest for the bird that talks and reveals the truth, alongside a singing tree.

Jonas Basanavicius collected a few variants in Lithuanian compilations, including the formats The Boys with the Golden Stars and Tale of Tsar Saltan.

German professor Karl Plenzat (de) tabulated and classified two Lithuanian variants, originally collected in German: Goldhärchen und Goldsternchen ("Little Golden-Hair and Little Golden Star"). In both stories, the queen replaces her twin grandchildren (a boy and a girl) for animals. When she learns they survived, she sends them after magical items from a garden of wonders: little bells, a little fish and the bird of truth.

Romania
Professor Moses Gaster collected and published a Romani tale from Romania, titled Ăl Rakle Summakune ("The Golden Children"). In this tale, the prince is looking for a wife, and sees three sisters on his father's courtyard. The youngest promises to give birth to "two golden children, with silver teeth and golden hair, and two apples in their hands all golden". The sisters beg the midwife to substitute the twins, a boy and a girl, for puppies and throw them in the water. Years later, the midwife sends them for the "Snake's crown", the fairy maiden Ileana Simziana, the Talking Bird and the Singing Tree. The collector noted that the fairy maiden Ileana was the one to rescue the Brother, instead of the Sister.

In an Istro-Romanian tale collected by linguist Gustav Weigand and translated as Feciorii cu parul-de-aur ("The Golden-Haired Children"), three women talk just under the emperor's window: the first promises to bear him a son with golden head, the second a son with golden chest and the last to a pair of golden-haired twin boys. The emperor chooses the third woman as his wife and they marry. Later, when the emperor is away at war, the empress gives birth to her promised twins, but her mother-in-law takes the children and throws them in the water in a crate, placing two snakes in their cradle. The twin boys are saved from the river by a miller. As for the empress, after her husband returns from the war and sees the snakes, she escapes to the village and lives by herself. Years later, the twins decide to leave their adoptive father's home and go to the village, where, unknowingly, they take shelter with their mother.

Russia and Eastern Europe

Slavicist Karel Horálek published an article with an overall analysis of the ATU 707 type in Slavic sources. Further scholarship established subtypes of the AT 707 tale type in the Slavic-speaking world: AT 707A*, AT 707B* and AT 707C*.

Russia

Eastern Europe

Belarus

Ukraine

Slovakia

Poland

Czech Republic

Bulgaria

Slovenia

Serbia

Croatia

Bosnia

North Macedonia

Bashkir people
According to Russian scholarship, the tale type is also "well-known" in the Bashkir tale corpus.

In a Bashkir tale, Санай-батыр ("Sanai Batyr"), Ulmes-Bey Batyr, an old hunter, falls ill during a hunt. His son, Kusun-batyr, journey through the whole "white world" for a cure for his father. He comes near a tree where a nest of vipers is attacking a wolf den. For three nights, Kusun Batyr kills the serpents with his sword and the wolf, as a token of gratitude, leads the youth to three birch trees, where three maidens are weaving with birch leaves and with a bird claw. From these claws three remedies will spring: kumis, spider silk and honey. The wolf explains that a mixture of these three substances will heal his ailing father. The youth also learns that the three maidens wish to marry Kusun Batyr: the first, daughter of Toygonbeya-batyr, promises to make him the most delicious kumis; the second, daughter of Targynbea-batyr, promises to weave very light outfits of a white colour, and the third, daughter of a wise aksaqal (a village elder), promises to give birth to a son stronger that his father (Sanai Batyr). Kusun Batyr gets the remedies, saves his father and marries all three, designing tasks for them: the first wife shall cook, the second shall weave and the third shall bear him the fabled son. The first two wives, jealous of the third, conspire with a wtich midwife to replace the boy with a dog and abandon him in the woods. The boy, Sanai Batyr, is rescued by the wolf who helped his father and grandfather and grows to be a fine youth. He goes to the mountains, sees a duck become a maiden and captures her, making her his wife. Despondent, Sanai Batyr wishes to travel and see the whole world, and the wolf gives him the ability to become a wasp. In wasp form, he travels to his father's lands to listen to a caravan of travellers narrate the wondrous sights they have seen. Inspired by the fantastical stories, Sanai Batyr decides to have them in his own yurt.

In another Bashkir tale, "Черный щенок" ("The Little Black Dog"), a man named Bai has four wives. He tells them he will go on a long journey and asks them what they will give him when he returns. The first says she will hunt 40 partridges to feed his 100 servants; the second - she will weave boots made of sand; the third will sew gloves made of louse skin, and the fourth says she will give birth to two sons with golden heads, teeth of pearls and silver hair. All four wives fulfill their promises, but the first three wives at first try to kill the children by placing them under cow and horse hooves to be trampled, but they are left unscathed. They decide to cast them into the water and replace them with a little black dog. When Bai returns, he banishes the fourth wife with the little dog to a windowless hut in the woods. In exile, the little dog acquires human speech and helps his "mother", by fetching the wonderful things a traveller tells Bai. At the end of the tale, the little black dog rescues the human children by using four cookies baked with their mother's milk.

In a Bashkir tale titled "Конь пустыни" ("The Desert Horse"), a king goes on a hunt and spends the night in a bai's house. While he is asleep, the bai's three daughters admire him and make grand promises if each marries him: the elder sister promises to give birth to a son; the middle sister to a daughter, and the youngest, "white-faced" Aklima, promises twins, a boy and a girl. The king wakes up and decides to have Aklima as his newest wife, despite her father's protests that the elder should marry first. Some time later, the king has to depart for war, and leaves Aklima to his elder wife to be cared for during her labour. Aklima gives birth to twins, who are replaced for puppies and cast in a river by the elder wife. The king returns and, learning of the abnormal birth, orders Aklima to be tied to a post and to be spat on. Meanwhile, the children are rescued by a poor fisherman. After the fisherman dies, the twins leave his house and establish themselves in the forest. The king passes by them one day and tells his first wife about the encounter, who sends an old sorceress to visit the twins. The sorceress tells the female twin about a strange apple tree that exists in a deep forest, in the garden of the genies; a wonderful quray ("курай", in the Russian text) that sings the voices of the ancestors, kept inside a tower by the genies; and finally about the beautiful daughter of the genies who sleeps in a golden cradle. The male twin, with the help of a fiery desert horse, traverses the desert of the end of the world and finds the objectd at the end of each quest and finally the genie maiden, who marries the male twin. At the end of the tale, the maiden passes by her mother-in-law, gives her an apple from the apple tree to restore her strength, and plays the quray to reveal the whole truth to the king.

Gagauz people
In a variant collected from the Gagauz people by Russian ethographer , "Три сестры: дѣвушка обѣщавшая царевичу, если онъ возметъ ее замужъ принести сына съ солнцемъ во лбу, а дочь съ мѣсяцемь" ("Three Sisters: the youngest said that, if she were to marry the prince, she would give birth to a son with the sun on the forehead, and a girl with a moon"), the youngest sister gives birth to her promised wonder children, but an evil old witch casts them in the river. The son of the king orders her to be interred to the chest and for everyone who passes by to spit on her. The children, raised by a miller, pass by their mother, who recognizes them.

In a Gagauz tale titled "Девочка Гюн и мальчик Ай" ("Girl Sun and Boy Moon"), while their father is away grinding the grain, a shepherd's three daughters talks among themselves about marrying the son of the padishah: the elder promises to weave a carper large enough to cover the whole army, and there would still be space left; the middle that she can bake bread enough for the whole army, and there would still be some left; and the youngest promises to bear him twins, a boy with the moon on his forehead ("Ay") and a girl with the sun on the front ("Gyun"). While they are talking, the son of the padishah overhears their conversation and decides to marry the youngest sister. The padishah goes with his son to another country, and she gives birth to her promised twins. The padishah's wife, however, orders a witch to get the twins and cast them in the water, in a box. The box is eventually found by an old couple who raise the twins. Years later, the old witch goes to their house to convince them to seek an apple from Dyunnyaya-Guzel, her mirror and Dyunnyaya-Guzel herself. The boy, Ay, gets the apple and the mirror, but is turned to stone while he goes to get the maiden Dyunnyaya-Guzel. The female twin, Gyun, goes to get Dyunnyaya-Guzel and rescues her brother. The three return home and the twins' father prepares a feast in their honor. On their way there, the twins and Dyunnyaya-Guzel pass by the twins' mother, buried up to the torso, with some thorny branches for people to whip her, and do not whip her. During the feast, Dyunnyaya-Guzel warns the twins to avoid the food.

In a Gagauz tale titled "Девица с золотыми волосами и молодец с золотыми зубами" ("The Girl with Golden Hair and the Boy with Golden Teeth"), a padishah's neighbour convinces him to declare not to light any light at night throughout the city. The neighbour himself, however, disobeys the ban, despite being the one to suggest it, and the padishah goes to check on his house. The padishah spies his neighbour's three daughters singing about marrying the padishah's sons: the elder promises to build a large city to house an entire troop; the middle one about preparing honey for the troops, and some would still remain; and the youngest promises that, if she marries his youngest son, she will give birth to a girl with golden hair and a boy with golden teeth. The padishah takes them to his palace and marry them to his sons, and orders them to fulfill their boasts. The elder sisters, however, simply dismiss their boasts, and are imprisoned for this. The youngest fulfills hers and gives birth to her promised children. Her sisters become jealous of her success and wish she could suffer as they did. An old witch takes the children as soon as they are born, replaces them for little animals, and casts them in a box into the river. The box is found by an old couple who have a large herd of horses and a farm. They raise the twins and, on the old man's deathbed, the male twin is advised to find a horse with a star-shaped mark on its head, which will become the boy's companion. Later, they move out to the city. The old witch learns of the twins' survival and convinces the female twin to send her brother on quests: first, for elephant tusks to build walls with; secondly, for bearskins for the roof; thirdly, for flowers from Dyunnyaya-Guzel's garden; lastly, for fresh milk of sea mares, so she can bathe in and be even more beautiful. After the last quest, the old witch prepares a cauldron for the twins to bathe in, but the male twin's horse, knowing it is a trap, advises the boy to let the horse also bathe in the milk (so the animal can protect the twins with its breath). At the end of the tale, the horse tells the male twin their mother is the woman tied in a sack hung upon a tree, and advises the twins on how to draw their grandfather's attention and absolve their mother.

Kalmyk people

Crimean Tatars
According to scholarship, at least 4 variants have been collected from Crimean Tatar sources: Uch Kyz ("Three Girls"), Ak Kavak Kyz or Akkavak Kyz ("The Maid of the Eternal Tree"), Ay man Yildiz and Tuvarchynyn Uch Kyz (Crimean Tatar: "Туварджынынъ уч къызы"). In Uch Kyz, the third sister promises twins with uncommon hair color; in Akkavak Kyz, she promises twins, a boy and a girl, more beautiful than the Sun and the moon; in Ay man Yildiz, the male twin is born with a moon on the front and the female one with a star on the forehead; lastly, in Tuvarchynyn Uch Kyz, she gives birth to twins, the boy named Сырма ("Syrma"), and the girl Сырлы ("Syrly").

Kazan Tatars
In a tale from the Kazan Tatars, translated into Hungarian with the title Aranyfejű, ezüstkezű ("Golden Heads, Silver Hands"), a padishah's golden bird lands in a garden. Three maidens find the bird and will only return it if the padishah marries all three of them. First, however, he asks them about their skills: the first two focus on skills on weaving and sewing, but the third maiden promises to bear twin boys with golden hair and silver hands. The padishah marries all three; the first two do not deliver on their promises, while the third bears the twins. The boys are taken from her and cast into the water in a box that is found by a poor couple. Years later, one of the twins decides to travel the world and reaches another kingdom. The tale continues as tale type ATU 303, "The Twins or Blood Brothers", with the dragonslaying episode of type ATU 300, "The Dragonslayer". Finally, the tale concludes when the twins return to their father's court and reveal their life story.

Dagestan

Ossetia

Dargin people
At least two variants are reported to have been collected from Dargin sources: "Шах и бедная девушка" ("The Shah and the Poor Girl") and "Арц-Издаг" ("Silver Izdag"). In the first tale, the girl bears twins, a son with golden hair and a daughter with silver hair, and the hero is sent for a magic tree and a magical woman.

In the tale "Арц-Издаг" ("Silver Izdag"), three orphan sisters talk at night: the elder promises to feed the entire village with only a sakh of flour; the middle one promises to sew clothes for the entire village with only half a meter of satin; and the youngest wants to marry the "талхан" ("talkhan") and bear him a boy with golden hair, with the moon shining on one side and the sun on the other. The talkhan takes the youngest sister as his new wife (for he was already married to a previous one). The talkhan's first wife takes the boy as soon as he is born and casts him in the sea in a box, and puts two puppies in his place. The talkhan banishes his second wife. The golden-haired boy survives and is taken by a character named Урха хула аба ("Urha hula aba", "Old Woman of the Sea"). Years later, the boy just happens to meet the talkhan, and the talkhan's first wife realizes her step-son is alive. Thus, she goes to talk to the boy and convinces him to seek a tree with honey sap (or honey-butter tree) that can rejuvenate people, a cat that plays a zurna whose sounds cure whoever hears it, and a beautiful woman named Arts-Izdag, who can petrify her suitors.

Caucasus Mountains
German linguist Anton Schiefner collected an Avar language tale and published it in his work Awarische Texte. In this tale, Die schöne Jesensulchar ("The Beautiful Jesensulchar"), three sisters talk what they would do if the king chose one of them as his queen, the third promising to give birth to a boy with pearly teeth and a girl with golden locks. They are replaced by a puppy and a kitten and thrown in the water. Years later, they are set on a quest for an apple tree that talks with itself and dances when applauded, and a maiden named Jesensulchar as a friend for the Sister.

In a tale from the Nogais titled "Повелительница джиннов Сарыгыз" ("Sarygyz, the Sovereign of the Djinni"), the youngest of three princes rides in front of his brothers and stops to rest by a hill. He begins to hear womanly voices coming from uphill, one promising to sew her husband  a headband, the second that she can feed an entire nation with an egg, and the third that she will bear a golden-haired girl and a boy with silver eyebrows. The prince wakes up, talks to the girls (who are sisters) and brings them for him and his brothers to marry. The first two fail in fulfilling their boasts, but the youngest gives birth to her promised twins. The jealous sisters bribe the midwife to lock the children in a box and cast it in the sea. A fisherman and his wife find the box with the twins inside and raise them, since they had no children. Years later, the jealous aunts send a midwife to the fisherman's house. The midwife convinces the golden-haired sister to send her brother on quests: first, to get the horns of a spotted ram to make a bed for her; then, to plant a golden tree on the moon's side and a silver tree on the sun's side; thirdly, to get fresh kumiss from a herd of ten mares, and lastly, to get Sarygyz, the mistress of the djinni, as wife for her brother. Sarygyz has petrifying powers, but the male twin (the brother) succeeds in entering her tower and bringing her to their house.

Armenia

Georgia

Adyghe people

Azerbaijan

Ingush people

Abaza people

Abkhazian people
In a tale from the Abkhazians titled "Младшая дочь князя" ("The Youngest Daughter of the Knyaz"), a knyaz has three daughters and an apple tree with reddened fruits in his garden. He sets a challenge for his daughters' suitors: whoever shoots the apples with an arrow may marry one of his daughters. The son of a neighbouring king tries his luck and shoots an apple. The youngest daughter picks it up from the ground. The prince tries his luck again and shoots the other two fruits. All three sisters introduce themselves to him, who asks them about their skills: the elder two claim to be masters at any skill, while the youngest promises to give birth to a son whose half is of gold and another of silver. The prince marries the youngest. Some time later, he departs to fight in a war and leaves his wife in her sisters' care. Her son is born, but the jealous sisters take the boy and replace him for a puppy, cook him in a cauldron and pour out the liquids in the garden. The prince returns and, seeing the puppy, banishes his wife to the stables. Meanwhile, an aspen tree sprouts on the spot where they poured out the cauldron. The prince fells it down and uses it as beam in his house. His wife gets some splinters of the aspen to make a fire to warm herself. A coal jumps out of the fire and turns into a gold coin. She takes the gold coin and puts it into a chest. Some time later, she hears a voice coming from the chest: it is her son, half of silver and half of gold, now reborn. Mother and son return to the prince to reveal the truth, and he banishes his sisters-in-law.

In another Abkhazian tale titled "Как украли детей Багдажва" ("How Bagdazhva's children were stolen"), a man named Bagdazhv likes to travel the world. One day, he hears a mournful song being played in an instrument and follows the sound to its source: three women playing and mourning. Bagdazhv asks the girls what they are doing there; the three girls answer that they are orphans who only have each other. Bagdazhv brings the girls with him to a friend's house. Some time later, Bagdazhv asks the sisters about their skills: the eldest claims she can weave clothes for 10 people with sheep's wool; the second claims she can make a meal with bread and a bottle of vodka; the youngest promises to bear twins, a child of gold and a child of silver. Bagdazhv marries the elder sisters to friends and makes the youngest his wife. While he is away at war, the jealous sisters and a midwife replace the children for animals and cast them in the water. The twins are found by an old shepherd when he is grazing his she-goat, while their mother is banished to a seven-way crossroad. Years later, they grow up "different from anyone in the village". The midwife goes to the twins and persuades the brother to find as his wife the daughter of a prince who can petrify people. He passes the prince's test and marries his daughter. His sister also marries a prince and gives birth to a son. The brother's wife, a woman with all-knowing powers, sends the youth to rescue his mother from the crossroads. Bagdazhv then welcomes the twins and their spouses to a feast and the youth reveals the whole truth.

Kabardian people
In a tale from the Kabardian people titled "Чудесная гармошка" ("The Magical Garmon"), three brothers hunt in the forest at night and see a light in the distance coming from a cave. They reach the cave and see inside three women. The women explain that they are three sisters from a nearby village who were kidnapped by a man and taken to the cave, but now their captor has died and since then they have lived in the cave. The three brothers decide to marry the three women: the eldest promises to her husband that she will bear twins, a boy and a girl; the middle sister promises her spouse that she will bear a girl with half of her hair made of white gold and the other of red gold; and the youngest sister promises her man that she will bear a son to him, a Nart. Only the eldest gives birth to her promised children, who are "of extraordinary beauty", to the jealousy of her younger sisters. The two sisters take the children and cast them in the water in a box. The box is  found by an old couple, while their mother is exiled in the barn. The old couple raises the twins and names the girl Babukh and the boy Cherim. The boy becomes a fine and skilled hunter and the girl grows up to be a beautiful woman. Cherim kills a deer, to the amazement of the hunters (his father and uncles). Cherim is brought to the hunters' house and his mother, from the barn, notices him. The father discovers the truth and punishes the sisters-in-law. Later, a witch, sister to the punished sisters-in-law, goes to the twins' house and tells Babukh about a magical golden garmon between two rocks, and about a magical apple tree that blooms during the day and yields fruit at night, tended by a maid, sister of seven brothers. Cherim obtains the magical garmon, but is captured by the maid's brothers when he tries to get the apple tree. Cherim's "альп" ("alp") returns to their house and advises Babukh to take the garmon with her and ride to the house of the seven brothers to save Cherim.

Chechnya
In a tale from Chechnya titled "Зависть" ("Envy") or "Золотой мальчик и золотая девочка" ("Golden Boy and Golden Girl"), a mullah and two knyaz live in a village. The first knyaz has three daughters, and the second knyaz wants to marry one of them, so he inquires them about their skills: the elder sister says she can sew garments for 63 people with only a quarter of soft leather (maroquin); the middle one that she can make bread for 63 men with a single dish of flour; and the youngest that she will bear him a golden son and a golden daughter. The second knyaz marries the third sister, to the envy of the elders. After the knyaz leaves, his wife gives birth to a golden son and a golden daughter. The mullah, who feared that the knyaz would become even richer, advises the envious aunts to take the children and replace them for puppies, then to put the twins in a box and cast them in the water. The envious sisters carry out the mullah's plan, but the twins are found by a childless couple. The children grow up and leave their adoptive parents' house. They build a hut for themselves: the boy grazes the sheep in the forest and the girl stays home and prepares the food. The father, the second knyaz, sees the boy, which alerts the envious sisters. They confabulate with the mullah about a plan to get rid of them. The mullah goes to the twins' hut and convinces the sister to seek a golden goat that dances and grazes beyond seven mountains, a wonderful apple tree that never loses its golden apples, and a maiden named Малха-Азани (Malkha-Azani), who lives beyond nine mountains, as wife for her brother. The golden boy goes to Malkha-Azani on his horse and forces her to restore the petrified men near her palace, which she does by taking out her enchanted mirror. Malkha-Azani becomes the male twin's wife and lives with them. One day, the knyaz, their father, tells the two sisters that he will invite the twins for a feast, but he will dig up a hole in the forest and cover it with a carpet. Malkha-Azani warns the twins of the danger and they go to the knyaz's palace through another path. Malkha-Azani and the twins arrive at the palace, but she tells the knyaz they won't join them until the knyaz brings the woman he expelled. Malkha-Azani then explains that the golden twins are his sons.

Asia

Turkey

Israel

Middle East

Lebanon

Syria

Palestine

Iraq

Assyrian people

Saudi Arabia

Kurdish people

Pamir Mountains
In a tale from the Pamir Mountains, from the collection of Ivan Zarubin, "Три сестры" ("Three Sisters"), the royal vizier overhears the three sisters' talk while they are getting water, the youngest promising to bear a golden-haired boy and a beautiful girl if she marries the king. The vizir reports his findings to the king and he marries the third sister. When the twins are born, they are replaced by two puppies, but are found by the gardener. Years later, they are sent after a dress made by the claws of a fox, a magic mirror that can see the whole world and the talking parrot. The parrot stops an accidental marriage between the king and his daughter, and the gardener tells the twins the truth of their adoption in a banquet with the monarch.

Iran
Professor , in his catalogue of Persian folktales, listed 10 variants of the tale type across Persian sources, which he classified as Die gerechtfertigte verleumdete Frau ("The calumniated girl is vindicated"). These stories vary between the quest for the usual treasures and the Fairy Maiden.

Regional tales
In a variant titled The Story of the Jealous Sisters, collected by Emily Lorimer and David Lockhart Robertson Lorimer, from Kermani, a father abandons his three daughters in the woods. A prince finds them and marries the youngest sister. After she becomes his wife, she gives birth to twins: "a son with a tuft of golden hair and a daughter with a face as beautiful as the moon". Her jealous sisters throw them in the stream. The prince condemns his wife to be trapped in a lime pillar and for stones to be thrown at her. Years later, when the brother passes by her, the youth throws a rose leaf at her, which prompts the king to summon his sisters-in-law.

In a variant from Bushehr Province, published in 2003 with the title  (English: "The Shah and the Seven Women"), a childless king hasn't fathered a son, despite being married to six co-wives. During a hunt, he sights a beautiful peasant maiden and asks her father for her hand in marriage. She becomes the seventh queen and gives birth to a boy and a girl. The other six wives, jealous of her, bribe the midwife to get rid of the babies in a wooden box and to replace them for puppies. The wooden box with the twins is cast in the sea, but they are rescued by an old woman. Years later, they move out of the old woman's house to another home in the woods, where the king sees them. He tells the other queens about the encounter and the six women, fearing the king might discover the truth, send the midwife to convince the twins to seek Manni Chen (a magical harp that sings) and a shining scarf from the ghouls.

India

Bangladesh
At least one variant of tale type 707 is attested in the academic literature of Bangladesh.

Tibet
Two other Asian versions were recorded by M. Potanine (Grigory Potanin): one from Amdo, in northeast Tibet, from an old "Tangoute" that hailed from Lan-tcheou (in Kan-sou); and a second one that he heard in Ourga (ancient French language name for the city of Ulaanbaatar). The Amdo/Tangut story begins largely the same: two princesses, Ngulyggun ("silver queen") and Kserlyg gun ("golden queen") play the basin game with the king's maid, Yog-tamu-nzo. The princesses lose a silver and a golden basin, the maid returns to the king to inform him, and goes back to the princess with the false story about them being expelled from the kingdom. The maid forces the princesses to exchange places on their way to another realm. They meet a prince; he shoots three arrows to choose his cook and they fall near Kserlyg. On their way to the prince's palace, the maiden Yog-tamu pushes Kserlyg into a lake to drown, forces Ngulyggun into menial service and becomes queen. Ngulyggun, while taking the sheep to graze, receives the visit of her sister's spirit, who gives her bread and food. Yog-tamu discovers this situation and kills Kserlyg's spirit. Ngulyggun gives birth to a half-silver, half-golden child, and Yog-tamu orders the baby to be trampled by sheep, but they scatter. She orders to be trampled by cows and horses, but the baby is spared. Then she orders the baby to be buried in a hole and for it to be filled with manure. A flower sprouts. A sheep eats it and gives birth to a piebald sheep, who talks to its human mother, Ngulyggun. The false queen orders the sheep to be slaughtered and its bones gathered by Ngulyggun. The maiden takes the bones to a cave and, for three times, the bones become a lama. The lama asks his mother to summon the false queen to the cave, where the whole truth is revealed.

Northern Asia

Mansi people
In a tale from the Vogul (Mansi people) published and translated by Finno-Ugricist János Gulya (de) with the title A legkisebb nővér fiacskája ("The Little Son of the Youngest Sister"), each one of three sisters leave home and are forced to marry the same man, an old man who lived in a hut in the woods. One day, before he goes on a hunt, he asks his three wives what they will give him when he returns. The oldest answers she will weave a great linen for him with 100 fathoms, the second that she will weave a heavy 100-pound net, and the third that she will bear him a son with silver arms, golden legs, a sun on the front and the moon on the back of the neck. The boy is born, but cast in the sea and replaced for a little dog. The husband is furious with the third wife, breaks her arms and throws her in the sea with the little dog. They wash ashore on a beach, she heals herself with dew and lives with the little dog in a small cave. The petit animal rescues the little boy with wooden bowls of her breastmilk and takes him to his mother, who confirms their relationship by jets of her breastmilk. The boy grows up in days and builds a house for them on the beach. Sailors come to visit the house and report to the old man their findings. The old man's two wives try to dismiss the sailors' story by telling about even more extravagant sights: a bull with a sauna between its horns, and a birch tree with a cuckoo that produces silver when it sings. The man's son learns of this by a looking glass and commands his servants to have these things on his house.

Khanty people
In a tale collected by Serafim Keropowitsch Patkanov (de) from the Ostyak (Khanty people) with the title The Story of a Wise Maiden, three princes seek wives for themselves. When walking through a city in the dark of night, they see a light in the distance coming from a house. They get a ladder and peer into the illuminated room. Three sister are talking: the eldest wants to marry the elder prince and bear him two daughters, the middle one the middle prince and bear him a daughter and a son; and the youngest wants to marry the youngest prince, and she shall bear him a daughter and two sons, each of them with shining heavenly stars on the crown on their heads, the sun on the forehead, a moon on the back on the neck, and the youngest son shall have the joints of his right hand and right foot in a golden color. She marries the younger prince and bears the three children. Each time, her sisters take the baby to be eaten by "an upper and a lower shade", but, failing that, replace them for puppies. Their mother is nailed to the church door, while the children are reared in a moos. The sisters learn of this and throw the babies in the water to die, but they are saved by a poor fishing couple. Years later, the siblings, now adults, talk to coming traders, and the girl gives them a dog (the younger brother). When the traders depart and reach another town, the brother-as-dog overhears their conversation about wondrous things: a birch tree with small bells and tambourines that when shaken produces silver, a reindeer stag whose antlers hold tinkling silver bells, and a girl with heavenly stars on the crown of her head, a sun on the forehead and the moon on the back of her neck that lives in an iron house at the end of the world. The two brothers get the first two objects and decide to make the woman the bride of one or the other. The brothers fail to get the maiden from the iron house, but their sister visits her and convinces her to resurrect her brothers. The four return to their adoptive parents' house. Some time later, the girl from the iron house tells them about their birth mother, and goes with the sibling to a dinner with the king. The mother is taken off the church door, clothed and bathed and presented to the dinner. The girl from the iron house tells her to squeeze her breasts, so that her breastmilk flows into the mouths of the siblings, proving their relationship.

Yukaghir people
In a tale collected by ethnographer Vladimir Jochelson from the Yukaghir people with the title "Сказка о стучащей ягодъ девушки" ("The Tale about the Berry-Picking Women"), a man has two wives. When he goes to a hunt, his elder wife promises to give him new clothes when he returns, while the younger wife promises to give birth to a son with the sun on the forehead, the star on the top of his head, and a moon on the neck.

Altai people 
In a tale from the Altai people, collected in 1935 and published in 1937 with the Russian title "Боролдой-Мерген" ("Boroldoy-Mergen"), an old man named Укючек ("Ukyuchek") and his wife Байпак ("Baypak") have three daughters. One day, they receive news an evil creature named Almys is coming down from the Altai Mountains to devour the people, and they fear for their three daughters, so they send them to gather berries with bottomless sieves while they stay at home. The girls go and get berries and return home late at night, but do see their parents. Each of them find an object on the ground: a bar, scissors and a horn, and leave home. On the road, they look behind them and notice the Almys is after them, so they throw the objects to create obstacles for their pursuer, as they make their way atop an oak tree. The Almys comes to the oak with an axe and begins to chop it down, until a fox appears and offers to help it. The Almys falls asleep and the fox throws the axe in a river and tells the girls to keep running. The Almys wakes up, gets the axe and runs after the girls. The fox appears before the girls and offers to help them cross a large sea, in exchange for them complimenting it. The fox fulfills her part of the deal, but also carves a boat (with a hole) for the Almys. The Almys tries to cross the lake and sinks. The girls, safe for now, take shelter under a cedar or pine tree, near a hunting party. The girls steal some of the hunting party food and climb a tree. The hunters notice their food was stolen and discover the girls. The maidens beg for the hunter to let them live, and throw their rings as engagement rings for whoever gets them first: the older sister for the elder hunter, the middle one for the middle hunter brother, and the younger sister for the younger hunter. Three marriages are celebrated. Some time later, the men are to go on a hunt, and ask their wives what they can prepare for their return: the elder sister promises to weave 30 pairs of boots with a stripe of hide; the middle sister that she will bake nine bags of tolkana with a single grain, and the youngest she will bear her husband a daughter with golden head and silver body. The hunters leaves for the hunt; the elder sisters fulfill their tasks, but take their niece as soon as she is born and replace her for a blind puppy. The next years, the hunters prepare to leave for another hunt and ask a similar question for their wives: the elder promises to weave 60 coats with a single sheepskin. the middle one will prepare 60 tashaurs with a single cup of milk; and the youngest promises to bear a golden son with silver head. Just like before, the elder sister fulfill their promises, but take their nephew and replace him for a blind kitten. The youngest hunter, tired of her unfulfilled claims, takes her out of the hut, blind one of her eyes, breaks her arms and legs and leaves her to die on the steppes. The girl, however, is still alive, and cries over her lost children. She then sees a mouse eating some sort of herb and becoming healthy again, and repeats the animal's action, restoring her to full health. Living on the healing herbs alone, she wanders through the mountains until she takes shelter with an old man who tells her her children were drowned in the White Sea, but she can save them. The maiden goes to the White Sea and sees two children coming out of the lake. As soon as she approaches them, the children escape back to the water. The next time, the maiden holds the children close to her against the waves of the lake, and rescues them. She proves their parentage by having a jet of milk come out of her breasts into their mouths. They then decide to establish themselves in the mountains, and the siblings, years later, come back to their father's hut to take revenge on their aunts for their deception. The siblings returns to their mother, but find she has died in their absence. They bury her in Mount Temir-Tau. The pair then begin to live alone, and the story explains their names are "Боодой-Кокшин" (Boodoy-Kokshin, the sister) and "Боролдой-Мерген" (Boroldoy-Mergen, the brother). The tale then continues with Boodoy-Kokshin getting fire from a neighbour (the Almys in disguise), and dying by having her blood sucked off by the Almys; and her brother burying her in a casket in the mountains. Then, Boroldoy-Mergen takes his horse Chubarka to another kingdom where he finds three supernatural maidens in the golden palace; later, he pays a visit to his sister's coffin, and the Almys sucks his blood, killing him. Suddenly, the rocks break apart and a stream of reviving water ("water of life") resurrects Boodoy-Kokshin. The girl wakes up and, seeing her dead brother, takes his horse Chubarka to the golden palace to ask for the help of the supernatural maidens.

Buryat people

Torghut people

Central Asia

Uzbekistan

Kyrgyzstan

Kazakhstan

Tajikistan

Tuva

Tofalar people

Karakalpak people

East Asia

Japan

China

Chinese folklorist and scholar  established a second typological classification of Chinese folktales (the first was by Wolfram Eberhard in the 1930s). In his new system, tale type 707, "The Three Golden Sons", shows the rivalry between the king's other wives; the number of children vary between stories, and the animal that replaces the children "is often a dead cat". One of the variants of his selected bibliography shows the quest for a magical tree and a girl, and in another for a bird of happiness.

A famous Chinese story that follows the replacement of the child for a cat is Limao huan taizi (English: "Cat in Exchange for a Prince"; "Exchanging a Leopard Cat for a Prince"), attested in the literary work The Seven Heroes and Five Gallants. In this story, a consort, jealous of the other, replaces the latter's son for a cat and gives the child for a eunuch to drown. Out of pity, the eunuch smuggles the child out of the palace, to the residence of another prince. The child is then raised by this second prince, unaware of his true origins.

In a tale collected from a Chinese-American source from California, titled The Long Lost Mother, a king is childless, but his queen promises him a boy. When his son is born, a guard who hates the royal couple replaces the boy for a slain cat. The queen is accused of infidelity and banished from the palace. She ends up in poverty and finds a lonely child in a small house. She decides to adopt the baby as her son. Despite its origin as literary tale, Chinese scholar Ting Nai-Tung acknowledged that its oral variants "clearly belong[ed]" to tale type ATU 707.

In a tale from the Oroqen people titled Nameless Hunter, a talented hunter, skilled in archery, lives in the Hinggan Mountains. Due to his great skills, many girls are interested in him, but onlu three maidens end up marry him. Time passes, and, one day, Nameless Hunter tells his three wives he will go on a hunt, and asks them what they will greet in his return. The first wife promises to sew him a new hat; the second wife promises to sew a new fur coat with lace; and the third wife announces she is pregnant and their son will be born when he returns. While their husband is away, the first two wives set a trap for the youngest before she gives birth: they place her on a tall wooden platform for her to fall, but she gives birth to her baby safely. Before their husband returns, the two wives take the baby and throw him in a small lake, and place a puppy in his place. Nameless Hunter comes back and, deceived by the two wives, beats up the Third Wife with a stick and locks her with the puppy. Later, the girl cries so much she loses her sight. She wanders off to the edge of the lake. Her son, rescued from the water by Kindhearted Water Mother, comes out of the lake and meets his mother, who asks him to nurse from her, thus confirming their relationship. When the little boy is 10 years old, he goes back to his father and exposes the trickery of the other wives.

In a tale from the Lahu people with the title The King's Three Children who had to Suffer, a king has seven wives and declares he will make his major wife the one that gives birth to a male heir. The king's seventh queen becomes pregnant, and the other six queens, feeling threatened, take the boy as soon as he is born and cast him in the river in a raft. The same destiny befalls the seventh queen's next children (a boy and a girl). The three children are saved and raised by a poor childless couple. Years later, after their adoptive parents die, the boys grow up as fine hunters, while their sister stays at home. One day, a person comes to their house and says they lack the eternal water (Lahu: ika ti), the tree of life (Lahu: napfuh law ceh) and a talking bird (Lahu: taw yaw pui ve nga eh).

Uyghur people 
In a tale from the Uyghurs titled "Чин Томюр и Махтум-сула" ("Chin Tomyur and Mahtum-sula") or Chin Timur and Mahtumsala, a king has two wives; the younger gives birth to a boy and a girl, but the elder co-wife replaces them for puppies and throws them in the lake. A she-bear raises the children, who are named Chin Tomyur (the boy) and Mahtum-sula (the girl). When they are older, Mahtum-sula stays home while Chin Tomyur goes hunting. One day, the boy orders his sister to never let their fire in the hearth go out. It happens so and Mahtum-sula needs to go to a neighbour to find another source. She meets an old woman who gives her a hot coal and some millet seeds. The seeds make a trail back to the siblings' house that the old woman follows and turns into a seven-headed dragon. Chin Tomyur kills the seven-headed monster and saves his sister. The tale then continues with further adventures.

Korea

Mongolia

Southeast Asia

Indonesia

Myanmar

Philippines

Africa

North Africa

Tunisia

Algeria

Egypt

Morocco

Sudan
In a Sudanese variant published by S. Hillelson, The Talking Parrot, a sister, with the ability to make rain fall when she cries, to produce pearls and coral when she laughs, is convinced by an old woman to send her brother to seek a talking parrot.

Authors Ahmed Al-Shahi and F. C. T. Moore collected a Sudanese tale from a Ja'alyin source with the title How Wad al-Nimair - shame upon him - married his daughter. In this tale, a man has seven wives and brings in an eighth one to live with him. The eighth wife gives birth to a girl, but the co-wives take her and put a broom in her place. The next year, she gives birth to twin boys, al-Hassan and al-Husain, who are replaced by stones and cast in the river. The three children are swallowed by a big fish, but, when the river dries up, they exit the fish's belly and make their way to a village, where they build a house for themselves. While the girl takes care of babies and sweeps, the brothers play with the boys of the village. One day, the girl finds a pot of gold, which she later shows her brothers when they are old enough. Years later, some women of the village convince the brothers to steal Wad al-Nimair's golden hen with its chicks. They succeed, but Wad al-Nimair is warned of the crime and imprisons the twin brothers. The same women prick a thorn in their sister's head and she becomes a turtle-dove. In this form, she flies next to her brothers' cell and asks about their situation: the first time, they are crying, and the turtle-dove cries with them, summoning rain; the second time, they are lying on silk, and the little bird laughs, producing coins from her mouth. The third time, Wad al-Nimair finds the bird and plucks the thorn from her head, turning her back into Path-of-the-Flood (the girl's name). Struck at her beauty, he decides to marry her and releases her twin brothers. On the wedding day, another turtle-dove perches on a tree before them, and sings about Wad al-Nimair is marrying his own daughter. His suspicions aroused by the bird's words, Wad al-Nimair inquires al-Hassan and al-Husain, who confirm the story. Wad al-Nimair then beheads his seven co-wives, reinstates his eighth wife and welcomes Path-of-the-Flood, al-Hassan and al-Husain as his children.

Central Africa

West Africa

A variant of The child born with a moon on his breast is mentioned by Édouard Jacouttet as hailing from "Gold Coast", an old name for a region on the Gulf of Guinea in West Africa: a king named Miga has many wives, who had not born any children. A witch doctor gives a remedy for the wives: all of them give birth to animals, except one, who mothers a son "with a peculiar sign on his forehead", just like his father. This tale was first recorded in 1902 by G. Härtter, from the Ewe people in Togo.

In a Senegalese tale, The child with a star on the forehead, originally collected in French by Lilyan Kesteloot and Bassirou Dieng with the title L'enfant qui avait une étoile sur le front, the jealous co-wives replace the chief's son for a bottle, but the boy is rescued by a helpful old woman. She raises him and directs him to meet his father.

Hausa language

Cape Verde
Anthropologist Elsie Clews Parsons collected some variants from Cape Verde Islands, grouped under the banner of The Envious Sisters. The wonder children appear in four of them. In one, collected in San Anton (sic), the third sister promises three children with gold stars on the forehead; in the second from the same island, a servant of the king gives birth to triplets with gold stars on the forehead. In the main text, provided by Antonio da Graça of San Nicolao (sic), the third sister gives birth to two boys and a girl with a gold star on the forehead, in three consecutive births. In the fourth, collected from Fogo, the boy has a gold star on the forehead, and the girl a golden apple on her hand.

In a second set of Cape Verdean variants, the children are replaced for animals and saved by the Old-Woman-of-the-Sea. These tales also lack the quest for the items.

East Africa

In an East African tale translated into Russian as "Волшебный цветок" ("The Magic Flower"), a poor woman offers his beautiful daughter as the newest wife for the king. The king is taken with her beauty and pays a bride price to the woman, who predicts her daughter will bear seven children to him. THe king has had a previous wife, who dislikes the co-wife. While the king is away, the younger wife gives birth to six boys and a girl, who the elder wife replaces for seven stones and casts them adrift in the river. A poor fisherwoman rescues the children and raises them. Years later, the elder wife and the midwife conspire to send the seven siblings on difficult quests, so the midwife comes to the fisherwoman's humble house and tells the girl, Katumbi, about a baby cobra, a lion cub and the magic flower Kisulumbuku ("цветок Кисулумбуку"). Katumbi's six brothers finds the objects and the flower, which can speak, tells the king the whole story.

Southern Africa

Namibia

Sotho people

Xhosa people

Madagascar

Réunion
In the island of Réunion, a variant was collected from local male storyteller Germain Elizabeth, born in 1895, with the title Kat fler d-roz ("Four Rose Blossoms"). In this variant, three orphan girls express their wishes to marry the king's cook, the king's baker, and the king himself. The king marries the youngest, and, she is to give birth, she is to ring a golden bell for a son, and a silver bell for a girl. She gives birth to two boys and a girl in three consecutive births, but the children are replaces for two puppies and a kitten. An old fairy rescues and raises the children as their foster mother, and she helps them to obtain the treasures: the dancing apple, the singing water, and the bird of truth from the garden of a woman named Four Rose Blossoms lives. Professor Lee Haring also noted that his tale was a "descendant" from Galland's Two Sisters and Grimm's Three Little Birds and, like those tales, also classified as type 707.

Mayotte
A Maorais variant was collected from teller Afiatu Sufu of Mtsapere in the Shimaore language. In this tale, titled Vovoo mutseha na Rambuu mulagua or La Noix d'Arec qui rit et la Feuille de Bétel qui parle ("The Laughing Areca nut and the Speaking Betel leaf"), a poor girl grows up and becomes ill. Whenever the king passes by her village, she shouts at him to cure her, and in return she will give him seven children, six boys and a girl. The girl pleads him so insistently he cures her. Some months later, the girl loses her grandparents, but marries the king, who already has a previous wife. When she is in labour, the first wife and an old woman act as midwife to the second queen in the delivery, replacing the children for stones. The seven siblings are found by a poor old couple. Years later, the old midwife convinces the youngest sister to send her brothers for the lioness's milk, the laughing Areca nut and the speaking betel leaf.

Americas

North America

United States
Professor and folktale collector Genevieve Massignon collected the tale titled Les Trois Sœurs abandonnées, part of a collection of 77 stories obtained from fieldwork from Madawaska, Maine.

A few versions have been collected from Mexican-American populations living in U.S. states, such as California and New Mexico, and in the Southwest.

In a variant collected around Los Angeles area, there are two sons, one golden-haired and the other silver-haired, and a girl with a star on her forehead, while a second variant mixes type ATU 425A ("Search for The Lost Husband") with type ATU 707.

A variant was collected from a Spanish-descent fifteen-year-old named Philomene Gonzalez, from Delacroix Island, Louisiana, in 1941. In this variant, titled Golden Star, a maiden wishes to marry the prince and to have a boy with white and golden hair and with a star on the forehead. She gives birth to this boy and a girl with the same traits the following year. An old woman replaces the children for puppies and throws them in the river, but God rescues them. This version lacks the quest for the items, and concludes when God sends them to a feast with the king.

Native Americans
In a Chippewa tale collected in 1942 from Delia Oshogay, in Court Oreilles, Oshkikwe's Children, Oshkikwe is the youngest sister who marries the king because she promised to give birth to three children: two boys, and the last a girl with golden hair and a star on her forehead. Her two sisters, the elder named Matchikwewis, become jealous and enraged that they married lowly men and devise a plan: cast the children into the river and replace them for animals, causing the queen to be imprisoned by her husband. The children are rescued and raised by an old couple, then go on a quest for the "golden bird that talked".

Anthropologist James Teit collected a tale from the Upper Thompson River Indians titled Spiṓla. A white woman is exiled from home, but meets a lodge where her four brothers lived. She helps them and is blessed with the ability to produce gold with her mouth. A chief's son marries her and she is pregnant. When the husband is called away to a meeting, her step-mother and step-sister help in the delivery. However, they make a hole in the floor, let the her sons fall through it and put a cat and a snake in their place. Seeing the animals, the chief's son condemns her to be drowned in the river, but her brothers rescue her. Meanwhile, the boys have been rescued by the woman's favourite dog named Spiṓla. The dog protects and feeds the children. One day, the woman's step-mother gives some poisoned food to the boys and they die. The dog Spiṓla decides to go to the house of the Sun to seek help, and on his way is questioned by three people to find answers to their problems (a la "Three Hairs from the Devil's Beard"). When the dog resurrects the boys, one boy has a shining sun on the forehead, and the other a bright moon. Lastly, Spiṓla decides to find the wise Bird, who "talked all languages, knew the future, and never told a lie". Stith Thompson related this tale to the cycle of "The Bird of Truth".

Researchers Darwin Hanna and Mamie Henry collected a Nlaka'pamux tale which they translated as Dog Travels to the Sun. In this tale, a woman declares she will give birth to four children: one with the sun on the forehead, another with a star, a third with the moon, and the last with a lightning. When the times come for the birth of the first child, an old midwife assists in her labour, but she drops the baby through a hole in the floor and replaces them for a kitten. The same thing happens with the other children: they are replaced by a frog, a puppy and a snake by the midwife, who wants the woman's husband to marry her daughter. Seeing that his wife gave birth to animals, he banishes her to the pigsty and marries the midwife's daughter. Meanwhile, a Dog takes the children from under the house and looks after them. The animal decides to look for some medicine by going to the Sun's house, and meets people on the way looking for answers to their plights. Dog reaches the Sun's house and asks him about the medicine for the children; the Sun answers it just has to lick the children with its tongue to restore them, and tells it to bandage their foreheads to hide their astral birthmarks. It happens thus. One day, Dog takes the children to a gathering of people, where their father is also. The man lifts the bandage on one of his children and notices the shining birthmark. Realizing that his first wife did bear the children she promised, he ties the midwife and her daughter to horses to execute them and restores his first wife to her place.

New Mexico
A variant from Northern New Mexico was collected by José Manuel Espinosa in the 1930s from a twelve-year-old María del Carmen González, who lived in San Ildefonso. The tale was republished by Joe Hayes in 1998 with the title El pájaro que contaba verdades ("The Bird that spoke the Truth"). In this tale, originally titled Los niños perseguidos, a couple have three children: two boys with golden hair and a girl with a star on the forehead. They are kidnapped by an evil witch and left in the canyon to die. The objects they seek are a bird with green feathers, a bottle of holy water and a whistle.

A second version from New Mexico was collected by Professor R. D. Jameson, titled The Talking Bird, The Singing Tree, and the Water of Life, first heard by the raconteur in his childhood. In a second version by R. D. Jameson, the princess promises to give birth to twin boys: one golden-haired and one silver-haired.

In another variant, first collected in 1930 by Arthur L. Campa in his thesis (El Pájaro Verde; English: "The Green Bird"), the quest is prompted by the siblings's foster mother, in order to ensure a life-long happiness for them.

In another variant, titled The Three Treasures, the youngest sister wants to marry the prince and promises to give birth to golden-haired children. She gets her wish and gives birth first to a girl, then to two boys in the following years. Her sisters cast the siblings in the water, but they are saved by the gardener.

Canada

Mexico
A variant was collected from Tepecano people in the state of Jalisco (Mexico) by J. Alden Mason (Spanish: Los niños coronados; English: "The crowned children") and also published in the Journal of American Folklore. A version from Mitla, Oaxaca, in Mexico (The Envious Sisters), was collected by Elsie Clews Parsons and published in the Journal of American Folklore: the siblings quest for "the crystalline water, the tree that sings, and the bird that talks".

In a Yucatec Maya variant, Ooxtuul kiktsilo'ob or El Rey y Las Tres Hermanas ("The King and the Three Sisters"), the king marries the youngest sister and the elder ones replace the children for dead animals.

Central America

Four variants have been collected by Manuel José Andrade, obtained from sources in the Dominican Republic. The tales contain male children as the heroes who perform the quest to learn the truth of their birth. A later study by Hansen listed 12 Dominican variants.

The tale type is also present in the folklore of Puerto Rico (amounting to 9 local versions), and of Panama.

Anthropologist Elsie Clews Parsons recorded a tale from Martinica (L'arbre qui chante, l'oiseau qui parle, l'eau qui dort; English: "The singing tree, the talking bird, the sleeping water"), Guadalupe (De l'eau qui dort, l'oiseau dite la vérité; English: "About the water that sleeps, the bird that tells the truth") and Haiti (Poupée caca la: Trois sé [soeurs] la). The version from Guadalupe begins like Snow White (ATU 709), a mother's envy of her daughter's beauty, and continues as ATU 707.

A version from Jamaica was collected by Pamela Colman Smith, titled De Golden Water, De Singin' Tree and De Talkin' Bird.

Douglas Taylor collected a tale from British Honduras (modern day Belize), in the Island Carib language, translated as Tale of a woman's three children, Hero is the eldest sister's name, Juana the intermediate one, Jessie the youngest,-three girls. In this tale, the king's son, the baker's son and the butcher's son pass by the girls' verandah, and the three sisters express their wishes for a husband: Jessie the king's son, Juana the baker's son and Hero the butcher's son. Their mother, Mrs. Willy, goes to the king, who arranges their marriages.  Jessie marries the king's son and he becomes king. He announces during an assembly of the people that he shall have three children, two boys and a girl, thet girl with a star on the forehead, one of the boys with a moon and the other with a sun. The elder sisters deliver the children, cast them in the water and replace them for a cat, a goat and a dog. The children are saved by a poor couple that lived by the river. After his adoptive father dies, the youngest son dreams that his father told him to seek the world's riches. The youngest goes and fails, his elder brother goes as well and fails, both turning to stone. The elder sibling, the girl, goes after them and captures a talking bird. The bird tells her to get a golden water, a branch of a singing tree and to sprinkle a bit of the water to restore her brothers.

South America

Brazil
Brazilian folklorist Luís da Câmara Cascudo stated that the tale type was brought to Brazil by Portuguese colonization. He also collected a variant from a woman named Benvenuta de Araújo, from Rio Grande do Norte. In this variant, titled A Rainha e as Irmãs ("The Queen and her Sisters"), the youngest marries the king and gives birth to two boys and a girl, all with a golden star. Her sisters replace them with frogs and a servant abandons them under a tree in the forest, but they are saved by a hunter. The siblings quest for the Água-da-Vida ("The Water of Life"). During a supper with the hunter, they invite a poor woman to join them, and she reveals she is the servant. The siblings forgive her and later reconcile with their father.

Another Brazilian version was collected by Brazilian literary critic, lawyer and philosopher Silvio Romero, from his native state of Sergipe and published as Os três coroados ("The three crowned ones") in his Contos Populares do Brazil (1894). In this version, the siblings are born each with a little crown on their heads, and their adoptive mother is the heroine.

Author Elsie Spicer Eells recorded a very similar Brazilian variant titled The Stone Twins: the queen gives birth to twins, but the queen's jealous sisters cast them in the river. They are saved by a poor fishing couple. Years later, the sisters meet the boys again and give them flowers and fruits that petrify them. The boys' foster mother is advised to seek the abode of the Sun, because he knows many things. The story continues as tale type ATU 461, Three Hairs from the Devil's Beard, wherein the hero or heroine gets asked three questions and the Devil (or the Sun, or Father Know-All in Slavic variants) is wise enough to know the answers.

Argentina

Chile

Colombia

Ecuador

Bolivia

Adaptations

Opera
The tale seems to have inspired Carlo Gozzi's commedia dell'arte work L'Augellino Belverde ("The Green Bird"). In it, the eponymous green bird keeps company to the imprisoned queen, and tells her he can talk, and he is actually a cursed prince. The fantastic children's grandmother sets them on their quest for the fabulous items: the singing apple and the dancing waters.

The tale has also inspired Canadian composer Gilles Tremblay to compose his Opéra Féerie L'eau qui danse, la pomme qui chante et l'oiseau qui dit la vérité (2009).

Literature
Lithuanian professor Asta Gustaitienė (lt) acknowledges that French-Lithuanian poet Oscar Milosz adapted a traditional Lithuanian variant titled Auksaplaukis ir Auksažvaigždė ("Golden-Hair and Golden Star"), by delving more into the relationships between the characters.

British author Alan Garner penned a children's fantasy book titled The Well of the Wind. In his story, twins, a boy and a girl, each with a shining star on the forehead, are found by a fisherman from a box drifting at sea. The fisherman raises them, but wraps a headscarf around each their heads to hide their birthmarks. Years later, after the fisherman dies, the twins live together in his hut. One day, while the boy is away, a witch visits the girl and tells her about "the springs of silver, the acorns of gold and the white bird of perfect feather", which is located in "the Well of the Wind". The boy is petrified when trying to get the bird, but the girl wins and restores her brother.

See also

Ancilotto, King of Provino
Princess Belle-Etoile
The Three Little Birds
The Bird of Truth
The Wicked Sisters
The Tale of Tsar Saltan
The Water of Life
The Pretty Little Calf
The Green Bird, an Italian commedia dell'arte by Carlo Gozzi (1765)

For a selection of tales that mix the wonder-children motif with the transformation chase of the twins, please refer to:

The Boys with the Golden Stars
A String of Pearls Twined with Golden Flowers

Footnotes

References

Bibliography

Afanasyev, Alexander. Народные Русские Сказки. Vol. 2.
Amores, Monstserrat. Catalogo de cuentos folcloricos reelaborados por escritores del siglo XIX. Madrid: Consejo Superior de Investigaciones Científicas, Departamento de Antropología de España y América. 1997. pp. 118–120. .
Ashliman, D. L. A Guide to Folktales in the English Language: Based on the Aarne-Thompson Classification System. Bibliographies and Indexes in World Literature, vol. 11. Westport, Connecticut: Greenwood Press, 1987. .
Atiénzar García, Mª del Carmen. Cuentos populares de Chinchilla. España, Albacete: , 2017. pp. 341–343. .
. Index of Spanish folktales, classified according to Antti Aarne's "Types of the folktale". Chicago: University of Chicago. 1930. pp. 81–82.
Braga, Teófilo. Contos Tradicionais do Povo Português. Vol. I. Edições Vercial. 1914. pp. 119–120.
Bolte, Johannes; Polívka, Jiri. Anmerkungen zu den Kinder- u. hausmärchen der brüder Grimm. Zweiter Band (NR. 61–120). Germany, Leipzig: Dieterich'sche Verlagsbuchhandlung, 1913. pp. 380–394.
. Cuentos tradicionales de León. Vol. I. Tradiciones orales leonesas, 3. Madrid: Seminario Menéndez Pidal, Universidad Complutense de Madrid; [León]: Diputación Provincial de León, 1991. pp. 432–433.
Clouston, W. A. Variants and analogues of the tales in Vol. III of Sir R. F. Burton's Supplemental Arabian Nights. 1887. pp. 617–648.
Cook, Arthur Bernard. Zeus, A Study in Ancient Religion. Cambridge University Press, 1925. Vol. II, Part I. Appendix F. pp. 1003–1019.
Cosquin, Emmanuel. Contes populaires de Lorraine comparés avec les contes des autres provinces de France et des pays étrangers, et précedés d'un essai sur l'origine et la propagation des contes populaires européens. Tome I. Paris: Vieweg. 1887. pp. 190–200.
Dawkins, Richard McGillivray. Modern Greek in Asia Minor: A study of the dialects of Siĺli, Cappadocia and Phárasa, with grammar, texts, translations and glossary. London: Cambridge University Press. 1916. p. 271.
De Faber, Cecilia Böhl, and Robert M. Fedorchek. "The Bird of Truth". In: Marvels & Tales 16, no. 1 (2002): 73–83. www.jstor.org/stable/41388616.
Delarue, Paul et Ténèze, Marie-Louise. Le Conte populaire français. Catalogue raisonné des versions de France et des pays de langue française d'outre-mer Nouvelle édition en un seul volume, Maisonneuve & Larose. 1997 .
Derungs, Kurt. AMALIA oder Der Vogel der Wahrheit. Mythen und Märchen aus Rätien im Kulturvergleich. Bündner Monatsblatt Verlag Desertina, 1994. .
 Goldberg, Christine. "Söhne: Die drei goldenen Söhne (AaTh/ATU 707)" In: Enzyklopädie des Märchens Online: Band 12: Schinden, Schinder – Sublimierung (Encyclopedia of Fairy Tales). Edited by Rolf Wilhelm Brednich, Heidrun Alzheimer, Hermann Bausinger, Wolfgang Brückner, Daniel Drascek, Helge Gerndt, Ines Köhler-Zülch, Klaus Roth and Hans-Jörg Uther. Berlin, Boston: De Gruyter, 2016. pp. 830–837. https://www.degruyter.com/database/EMO/entry/emo.12.183/html
El-Shamy, Hasan M. Types of the Folktale in the Arab World: A Demographically Oriented Tale-Type Index. xxviii + 1255 pp. Bloomington: Indiana University Press. September 2004.
Fomin, Maxim. "East meets West in the Land of Fairies and Leprechauns: Translation, Adaptation, and Dissemination of ATU 707 in the 19th–20th century Ireland". In: ՈՍԿԵ ԴԻՎԱՆ – Հեքիաթագիտական հանդես [Voske Divan – Journal of fairy-tale studies]. 6, 2019, pp. 12–34. 
Gonzenbach, Laura. Sicilianische Märchen. Mit Anmerkungen Reinhold Köhlers und einer Einleitung herausgegeben von Otto Hartwig. Leipzig: Engelmann. 1870. pp. 206–207.
Hahn, Johann Georg von. Griechische und albanesische Märchen. Leipzig: W. Engelmann. 1864. pp. 292–294.
Hoogasian-Villa, Susie. 100 Armenian Tales and Their Folkloristic Relevance. Detroit: Wayne State University Press, 1966. pp. 491–495.
 . Le conte kabyle: étude ethnologique. Paris: Éditions La Découverte, 2003 [1982]. p. 510. .
Miller, Elaine K. Mexican Folk Narrative from the Los Angeles Area: Introduction, Notes and Classification. Austin: University of Texas Press, 1973. pp. 256–257. .
Muhawi, Ibrahim; Kanaana, Sharif. Speak, Bird, Speak Again: Palestinian Arab Folktales. University of California Press, 1989. pp. 337–340. .
. Cuentos folklóricos de Chile. Tomo II. Instituto de Investigaciones Folklóricas "Ramón A. Laval". Santiago, Chile: Editorial Universitaria, 1961. pp. 318–319.
Pitrè, Giuseppe. Fiabe, Novelli e Racconti Poppolari Siciliani. Volume I. Italia, Palermo: Luigi Pedone Lauriel, Editore. pp. 331–335.
Потанин, Г. Н. [Potanin, Grigory N.]. Восточные параллели к некоторым русским сказкам [Eastern parallels to some Russian tales]. In: Этнографическое обозрение n. 1. Янчук Н.А. (ред.), Императорское Общество Любителей Естествознания, Археологии и Этнографии (ИОЛЕАЭ) при Московском Университете. Moskva: 1891. pp. 137–153.
Ritter, H., &  "Die goldhaarigen Zwillingskinder: Ein libanesisches Märchen aus dem Volksmund". In: Fabula, 10(1). 1969. pp. 86–99.
Schiefner, Anton. Awarische Texte. K. Akademie der wissenschaften, 1873. pp. XXI–XXVI (Vorwort).
Schönwerth, Franz Xaver von. The Turnip Princess and Other Newly Discovered Fairy Tales. Edited by Erika Eichenseer. Translated by Maria Tatar. Penguin Books, 2015. pp. 71–72.
 . Сказки и предания алтайских тувинцев [Tales and Legends of the Altaic Tuvans]. СобраС 43 ны Эрикой Таубе. Авторизованный перевод с немецкого Б.Е. Чистовой («Сказки и мифы народов Востока»). Moskva:  РАН, 1994. pp. 326. .
Thompson, Stith. The Folktale. University of California Press, 1977. .
. Lesebuchgeschichten: Erzählstoffe in Schullesebüchern, 1770–1920. Berlin: De Gruyter, 1993. p. 254.
Uther, Hans-Jörg. Deutscher Märchenkatalog – Ein Typenverzeichnis. Deutscheland, Münster: Waxmann Verlag GmbH, 2015. p. 161.  (e-book)
Власов, С. В. (2013). Некоторые Французские И ИталЬянскиЕ Параллели К «Сказке о Царе Салтане» А. С. ПушКИНа Во «Всеобщей Библиотеке Романов» Bibliothèque Universelle des Romans» (Biblioèque Universelle des Romans) (1775–1789) [Some French and Italian Parallels to Pushkin's "Tale of Tsar Saltan" in the Bibliothèque Universelle des Romans (1775–1789)]. Мир русского слова. (3): 67–74.
Хэмлет, Т. Ю. (2013). Описание сказочного сюжета 707 Чудесные дети в международных, национальных и региональных указателях сказочных сюжетов: сравнительный анализ. Научный диалог, (5 (17)), 198–219.
Хэмлет, Т. Ю. (2013). Описание сказочного сюжета 707 Чудесные дети в международных, национальных и региональных указателях сказочных сюжетов: сравнительный анализ: часть 2. Научный диалог, (10 (22)), 61–75.
Хэмлет, Т. Ю. (2014). Описание сказочного сюжета 707 Чудесные дети в международных, национальных и региональных указателях сказочных сюжетов: сравнительный анализ: часть 3. Научный диалог, (4 (28)), 100–114.
Zipes, Jack. The Great Fairy Tale Tradition: From Straparola and Basile to the Brothers Grimm. New York : W.W. Norton, 2001. pp. 220–305. .
 [Berezkin, Yuri E.] (2019). «Сказка О Царе Салтане» (Сюжет Aтu 707) И Евразийско-Американские Параллели. In: Антропологический форум, (43), 89–110. 
The Robber With a Witch's Head: More stories from the great treasury of Sicilian folk and fairy tales collected by Laura Gonzenbach. Translated and edited by Jack Zipes. New York and London: Routledge, 2004. p. 222. .

External links
 

Italian fairy tales
Fictional kings
Fictional queens
Twins in fiction
Fictional twins
Child abandonment
Adoption forms and related practices
Adoption, fostering, orphan care and displacement
Birds in culture
Fictional birds
ATU 700-749
Jón Árnason (author)
Thomas Frederick Crane